Gostinica (Serbian Cyrillic: Гостиница) is a village located in the Užice municipality of Serbia. According to the 2002 census, the village has a population of 639.

Užice
Populated places in Zlatibor District